Philip IV of Macedon (Greek: Φίλιππος Δʹ ὁ Μακεδών; died Autumn 297 BC) was the son of Cassander.  He briefly succeeded his father unopposed on the throne of Macedon prior to his death. Philip IV died of wasting disease at Elatea, leaving the throne to his two younger brothers, Antipater and Alexander.

Resources 

3rd-century BC Macedonian monarchs
Ancient Macedonian monarchs
297 BC deaths
3rd-century BC rulers
3rd-century BC Greek people
Year of birth unknown
Hellenistic rulers
Antipatrid dynasty